Seyyed Ebrahim Rural District is a rural district (dehestan) in Zarrinabad District, Dehloran County, Ilam Province, Iran. At the 2006 census, its population was 1,547, in 290 families.  The rural district has 9 villages.

References 

Rural Districts of Ilam Province
Dehloran County